The Communist Party of United States of India is an underground communist political party in India, based in the state of Andhra Pradesh. The CPUSI was formed on 17 May 1997 as a result of fractional infighting in the Communist Party of India (Marxist-Leninist) Janashakti. The founder of CPUSI was M. Veeranna and it is sometimes referred to as the 'Janashakti Veeranna' faction. Veeranna was later killed by police forces. CPUSI belonged to the section who wanted to put stronger emphasis on caste issues rather than class issues. CPUSI conducts armed struggle, through 'dalam' squads.

Sadhu Malyadri Jambhav is the Andhra Pradesh state secretary of CPUSI.

In June 2001 a high-ranking leader of CPUSI, Yerra Narasa Reddy, surrendered to the police.

References

Communist militant groups
Left-wing militant groups in India
Maoist organisations in India
Naxalite–Maoist insurgency
Political parties in Andhra Pradesh
Communist parties in India
1977 establishments in Andhra Pradesh